Anna Vladimirovna Shurochkina (born 15 August 1990), better known simply as Nyusha, is a Russian singer and songwriter. One of the most popular musicians in contemporary Russia, Nyusha has released eight number-one singles in Russia, holding the record for the greatest amount.

The daughter of former Laskovyi Mai member Vladimir Shurochkin, Nyusha began her career as a teenager, competing in New Wave 2008, where she placed seventh. Afterwards, she was signed to Warner Music Russia and released her debut studio album Vybirat chudo in 2010; the album went on to produce four number-one singles in Russia and Nyusha won Best Russian Act at the 2011 MTV Europe Music Awards. Her second studio album Obedineniye was later released in 2014, producing four more number-one singles and winning Nyusha the award for Best Russian Act again at the 2014 MTV Europe Music Awards.

Early life

Nyusha was born on 15 August 1990 into a family of musicians, her family is Georgian, also her father, Vladimir Shurochkin  was a former member of the musical group Laskovyi Mai (Ласковый май). Her mother, Irina Shurochkina sang in a rock band in her youth. 

At age 11 she began performing on stage in the group Grizli. The group toured in Russia and Germany. At age 17 she changed her name from Anna to Nyusha.
 thumb|Nyusha, 2011

Career

2007–2009: Early career

In 2008 Nyusha took seventh place in the international contest New Wave 2008 and also wrote the final song of the heroine in the dubbed version of the film Enchanted. In 2009, she released her first single Вою на луну (Voyu na lunu) or in English Howl at the moon.  Her composition won Song of the Year - 2009. At the concert Europa Plus Live 2009 she introduced the new songs  Angel in Russian and the English  Why?

2010–2011:  Vybirat chudo and breakthrough

In 2010 Nyusha released her second single  Не перебивай   (Do not Interrupt). In 2011, she released two new singles:  Больно (It Hurts) and Выше (Higher). These are the fourth and fifth singles from her debut album, Выбирать чудо.

2012–2015: Further success and development
In January 2012, the song Выше began to occupy the top position in many charts around Russia. On April 28 she gave a concert in the Crocus City Hall in Moscow, because of her first tour promoting her debut album Выбирать чудо. During the concert, the singer released three new songs: two singles (Воспоминание and Объединение) and a duet with her father (You are my life).

In March 2013 she released the song Наедине (Alone) as the second single of her second studio album, expected to be released by the end of the year.

Personal life 
In 2017, she married Igor Sivov in the Maldives and became stepmother to his two children from a previous marriage. The couple have a daughter born in 2018. Her name is Simba (Seraphima). In July 2021 Nyusha announced a second pregnancy.
Their son Saffron was born December 14, 2021.

Discography

Albums 
 2010 —  Выбирать чудо  (Choose Your Miracle)
 2014 —  Объединение  (Union)
 2020 —  Solaris Es (Solar Art)

Singles 
 2009 —  Вою на Луну  (Howl at the Moon)
 2010 —  Не перебивай  (Do Not Interrupt)
 2010 —  Выбирать чудо  (Choose Your Miracle)
 2011 —  Plus Près (We Can Make It Right)  feat. Gilles Luka
 2011 —  Больно  (It Hurts)
 2011 —  Выше  (Higher)
 2012 —  Воспоминание  (Memories)
 2012 —  Это Новый Год  (It's New Year)
 2013 —  Наедине  (Alone)
 2014 —  Только  (Don't You Wanna Stay)
 2014 —  Цунами  (Tsunami)
 2015 —  Где ты, там я  (Where You Are, There I Am)
 2016 —  Целуй  (Kiss)
 2016 —  Тебя любить (Always Need You)
 2017 —  Не боюсь (Not Afraid)
 2018 —  Ночь (Night)
 2018 —  Goalie Goalie (with Arash, Pitbull and Blanco)
 2018 —  Таю (Melting)
 2019 —  Я ищу его (I'm Looking For Him)
 2019 —  Между нами (Between Us) feat. Artyom Kacher
 2020 —  Mr. & Mrs. Smith feat. Egor Kreed
 2020 —  Пьяные мысли (Drunken Thoughts)
 2020 —  Дыши, люби, цени (Breathe, Love, Appreciate)
 2021 —  Грязные танцы (Dirty Dancing) feat. LSP
 2021 —  Небо знает (Sky Knows)

Charts 

«—» means that there was no song in the chart.

Music videos

References

External links 
 
 Nyusha at the Youtube 
 Nyusha on First Music Publishing
 Clips Nyusha (music.ivi.ru)
 Russian Airplay (tophit.ru)
 Nyusha at the Forbes

1990 births
21st-century Russian singers
21st-century Russian women singers
Living people
Russian child singers
Russian pop singers
Singers from Moscow
MTV Europe Music Award winners
20th-century Russian women singers
20th-century Russian singers
Winners of the Golden Gramophone Award
Sanctioned due to Russo-Ukrainian War